Rudolf Decker (born 13 August 1967) is a retired German football forward.

References

External links
 

1967 births
Living people
German footballers
MSV Duisburg players
VfL Bochum players
Rot-Weiß Oberhausen players
2. Bundesliga players
Place of birth missing (living people)
Association football forwards